CHON is a mnemonic acronym for the four most common elements in living organisms: carbon, hydrogen, oxygen, and nitrogen.

The acronym CHNOPS, which stands for carbon, hydrogen, nitrogen, oxygen, phosphorus, sulfur, represents the six most important chemical elements whose covalent combinations make up most biological molecules on Earth. They were created in stars in outer space a long time ago and when a supernova occurred, these elements were sent into space.  All of these elements are nonmetals.

In the human body, these four elements compose about 96% of the weight, and major minerals (macrominerals) and minor minerals (also called trace elements) compose the remainder.

Sulfur is contained in the amino acids cysteine and methionine.
Phosphorus is contained in phospholipids, a class of lipids that are a major component of all cell membranes, as they can form lipid bilayers, which keep ions, proteins, and other molecules where they are needed for cell function, and prevent them from diffusing into areas where they should not be. Phosphate groups are also an essential component of the backbone of nucleic acids (general name for DNA & RNA) and are required to form ATP – the main molecule used as energy powering the cell in all living creatures.

Carbonaceous asteroids are rich in CHON elements.
These asteroids are the most common type, and frequently collide with Earth as meteorites. Such collisions were especially common early in Earth's history, and these impactors may have been crucial in the formation of the planet's oceans.

The simplest compounds to contain all of the CHON elements are isomers fulminic acid (HCNO), isofulminic acid (HONC), cyanic acid (HOCN) and isocyanic acid (HNCO), having one of each atom.

See also 

 Abundance of the chemical elements
 Carbon-based life
Biochemistry
Bioinorganic chemistry

References

External links 

"Impact of the Biosphere on the Earth", University of Texas at Dallas

Astrobiology
Biology and pharmacology of chemical elements
Mnemonic acronyms
Science mnemonics
Science fiction themes
Astrochemistry